Samuel Elmore Cannery was a U.S. National Historic Landmark in Astoria, Oregon that was designated in 1966 but was delisted in 1993.

The home of "Bumble Bee" brand tuna, it was the longest continuously-operated salmon cannery in the United States, from its construction in 1898 until decommissioning in 1980. The canned salmon industry was a cornerstone of the Northwest's resource-based economy from the late 1860s until after World War II. Amidst declining salmon stocks, the cannery diversified into tuna in the 1930s. Due to structural deterioration, the building was slated for demolition in 1991, and it was destroyed by fire on January 26, 1993.

See also
 Sue H. Elmore (ship)
 List of canneries
 List of National Historic Landmarks in Oregon
 National Register of Historic Places listings in Clatsop County, Oregon

References

1881 establishments in Oregon
Buildings and structures in Astoria, Oregon
Seafood canneries
Former National Historic Landmarks of the United States
Buildings and structures demolished in 1993
Demolished buildings and structures in Oregon
Former National Register of Historic Places in Oregon